Seaford is a city located along the Nanticoke River in Sussex County, Delaware, United States.  According to the 2010 Census Bureau figures, the population of the city is 6,928, an increase of 3.4% from the 2000 census. It is part of the Salisbury, Maryland-Delaware Metropolitan Statistical Area.

It is the largest city fully within Sussex County.  It hosted the Seaford Eagles of the Eastern Shore Baseball League.

History
Seaford is named after Seaford, East Sussex in England.

All land in current western and southern Sussex County was first settled as part of Maryland. Seaford, along with Bridgeville, Greenwood, Middleford, and others, were all part of Dorchester County in the Province of Maryland. Blades, Laurel, and Concord areas, on the other hand, were part of Somerset County. It is reported that an error in a map coordinate resulted in the east-west line of Delaware being from current Delmar to Fenwick. The original agreement had the eastwest line at Cape Henlopen, not at the false cape. If the line had survived, Seaford would now be in Maryland. After many years in the courts of London, the boundary lines are as the surveyors Mason and Dixon defined in 1763.

Seaford is one of seven Main Street communities that participated in the Delaware Main Street Program to revitalize commercial districts.  From 1999 to 2000, Seaford's downtown was renovated to preserve historic details through $1.5 million of landscaping, street paving, sidewalks, lamp posts, street lights, and utility upgrades.

Geography

Climate

Situated on the Atlantic Coastal Plain, Seaford's weather is moderated by the Atlantic Ocean.  Seaford has a mild subtropical climate consisting of hot, humid summers and mild winters.  The average daytime high in July is 87 °F (30.6 °C) and a low of 65 °F (18.3 °C); in January, the average high is 44 °F (6.7 °C) with an average low of 25 °F (-3.9 °C)   The month of highest average rainfall is August with 5.59 inches (142.0 mm) of rain, while February is historically the driest month, receiving an average of only 3.17 inches (80.5 mm) of rain.

The highest official temperature ever recorded in Seaford was 104 °F (40.0 °C) on July 22, 2011, while the all-time low was -13 °F (-25.0 °C) on January 28, 1987.

According to the Köppen climate classification, Seaford has a humid subtropical climate (abbreviated Cfa).

Demographics

As of the census of 2000, there were 6,699 people, 2,629 households, and 1,664 families residing in the city. The racial makeup of the city was 64.04% White, 30.02% African American, 0.37% Native American, 1.49% Asian, 0.19% Pacific Islander, 1.72% from other races, and 2.16% from two or more races. Hispanic or Latino of any race were 4.25% of the population.

There were 2,629 households, out of which 31.5% had children under the age of 18 living with them, 37.8% were married couples living together, 22.3% had a female householder with no husband present, and 36.7% were non-families. 32.1% of all households were made up of individuals, and 15.4% had someone living alone who was 65 years of age or older.  The average household size was 2.36 and the average family size was 2.95.

In the city, the age distribution of the population shows 25.6% under the age of 18, 9.4% from 18 to 24, 24.1% from 25 to 44, 18.9% from 45 to 64, and 22.0% who were 65 years of age or older.  The median age was 38 years. For every 100 females, there were 77.6 males.  For every 100 females age 18 and over, there were 69.8 males.

The median income for a household in the city was $28,402, and the median income for a family was $39,688. Males had a median income of $30,467 versus $23,490 for females. The per capita income for the city was $15,022.  About 22.0% of families and 27.6% of the population were below the poverty line, including 43.4% of those under age 18 and 13.2% of those age 65 or over.

Art and culture

National Register of Historic Places
Sites listed on the National Register of Historic Places include:

 Building at 200–202A High Street
 Building at 218 High Street
 Building at High and Cannon Streets
 Burton Hardware Store
 J. W. Cox Dry Goods Store
 First National Bank of Seaford
 Hearn and Rawlins Mill
 Lawrence
 Maston House
 Jesse Robinson House
 Edgar and Rachel Ross House
 Gov. William H. Ross House
 St. Luke's Protestant Episcopal Church
 Seaford Station Complex
 Sussex National Bank of Seaford

Points of interest

 Nanticoke River Arts Council/Gallery 107.
 Seaford Christmas Parade.
 Nanticoke River Walk - a pedestrians walkwalk beside the Nanticoke River in downtown Seaford.
 Seaford Museum – located in a former post office.
 Ross Mansion and Plantation – former residence of former Delaware Governor William H. H. Ross; the  property includes the Gov. William H. Ross House, a granary with farm equipment exhibits, carriage house, a Victorian cottage and Delaware's only documented log slave quarters.
 Nanticoke Riverfest takes place in July and the Nanticoke River is used for inner tube floating. There is also a three-day festival.
 The AFRAM Festival is a celebration of African American culture held in August.

Library
Seaford District Library was founded in the early 1900s. It holds 28,000 items, and has a community center.

Parks and recreation
 Kiwanis Park – a memorial park.
 Gateway Park – a park with brick sidewalks and a fountain, forming the gateway into downtown Seaford.
 Soroptimist Park – a park located at Williams Pond complete with a playground and a pavilion.
 Nutter Park – contains a playground and basketball courts.
 Williams Pond Park – a ballpark run by the Nanticoke Little League.
 Sports Complex – includes the Jay's Nest community-built playground, and softball facilities.
 Hooper's Landing Golf and Country Club – a public 18-hole course, pool, tennis courts and driving range.

Government
Seaford has a mayor-council system of government with a mayor and a city council. As of 2022, the mayor of Seaford is David Genshaw, Dan H. Henderson is vice mayor, and the other members of the city council are Matthew MacCoy, Jose Santos, Orlando Holland, and James King.

Education
Seaford is home to the Seaford School District.  The District contains four elementary schools, one middle school and Seaford Senior High School.

Media

Radio
WGBG 92.7 FM broadcasts from just outside the city limits.

Television

WDPB-TV 64 is the only television station originating from Seaford.  It is a subsidiary of WHYY-TV in Philadelphia and an affiliate of PBS.

Newspapers
The Seaford Star is a weekly newspaper.

Infrastructure

Transportation

U.S. Route 13 is the main north-south thoroughfare within city limits, with Delaware Route 20 being the main east-west highway.  U.S. Route 13 connects Seaford with Bridgeville to the north and Laurel to the south as part of the Sussex Highway.  State Route 20 connects Seaford with Millsboro to the east and tiny Reliance, Maryland to the west.

The closest airport with commercial air service to Seaford is the Wicomico Regional Airport in Salisbury, Maryland. The closest public airport is Laurel Airport in Laurel, Delaware. There is also an airport in Georgetown called the Delaware Coastal Airport.  This airport has a jet service section, as part of the nearby industrial park.

DART First State operates the Route 212 bus that connects Seaford to Georgetown and Delmar and the Route 903F bus that runs on a loop through Seaford.

Freight rail service in Seaford is provided by two carriers: the Delmarva Central Railroad and the Maryland and Delaware Railroad.  The Delmarva Central Railroad runs north-south through the city, parallel to US 13. It interchanges with the Maryland and Delaware Railroad in Seaford, which heads west to Federalsburg and Cambridge in Maryland.

Utilities
The City of Seaford Electric Department provides electricity to approximately 6,700 customers in the city. The city purchases its electricity and is a member of the Delaware Municipal Electric Corporation. The Public Works department provides water and sewer service to the city. Natural gas service in Seaford is provided by Chesapeake Utilities.

Health care
TidalHealth Hospital and TidalHealth Cancer Care Center, both operated by TidalHealth Health Services, are located in Seaford.

Notable people
 Lee F. Booth, Aerospace Tycoon
 Delino DeShields, Former baseball player
 Stephanie Hansen, Delaware state senator
 Horace G. Knowles, U.S. Ambassador
 Mike Neill, Former Olympic baseball player
 Lovett Purnell, Former American football player
 Darnell Savage, American football player for the Green Bay Packers

References

External links

 City of Seaford

 
Cities in Sussex County, Delaware
Populated places established in 1672
1672 establishments in Delaware
Cities in Delaware
Salisbury metropolitan area